This is a list of RMIT University people.

This list of people includes alumni as well as current and former students and faculty of the Australian (RMIT University) and Vietnamese (RMIT University Vietnam) branches of the Royal Melbourne Institute of Technology (RMIT).

It also includes alumni as well as former students and faculty from its antecedents: Melbourne Technical College (MTC) and Working Men's College (WMC); amalgamations with: Emily McPherson College of Domestic Economy (EMC), Melbourne College of Decoration, Melbourne College of Printing and Graphic Art and Melbourne College of Textiles; and merger with Phillip Institute of Technology (PIT).

Art

Drawing and painting

Photography and printmaking

Sculpture and smithing

Others

Business and society

Design

Architecture

Fashion industry

Entertainment and media
Note: RMITV is a department of the RMIT University Student Union, which offers training accredited by RMIT.

Film and television

Journalism

Literature

Music industry

Government and law

Leaders

Ministers

Members

Others

Health and sports
Note: RMIT offers degrees in applied sciences of health and life, but does not have a medical school.

Health industry

Sports

Australian rules football

Science and technology

See also
RMIT University (Australia)
RMIT University Vietnam

References

Texts

External links

RMIT Alumni homepage
RMIT University homepage
RMIT University Vietnam homepage

 
 
 
 
 
Royal Melbourne Institute of Technology
Royal Melbourne Institute of Technology
Royal Melbourne Institute of Technology